Mem Rodrigues de Briteiros (c. 1225 – c. 1270) was a Portuguese nobleman, member of the Court of Afonso III of Portugal.

His parents were Rui Gomes de Briteiros (vassal of Afonso III) and Elvira Anes da Maia, a noble woman, descendant of Trastamiro Aboazar. His wife was Maria Anes da Veiga, daughter of João Pires da Veiga and Teresa Martins, and descendant of Mem Fernandes de Bragança.

References 

1225 births
13th-century Portuguese people
Portuguese nobility
Portuguese Roman Catholics